Norton is an unincorporated community in Randolph County, West Virginia, United States. It is a former coal town operated by the West Virginia Coal and Coke Company from the early 1900s until the late 1950s. Besides the mine, the town was once home to a company store, a company bank, and the Norton Grade School. The denominationally unaffiliated Norton Community Church still serves the town.

References

Unincorporated communities in Randolph County, West Virginia
Unincorporated communities in West Virginia
Coal towns in West Virginia